XHVOX-FM is a radio station on 98.7 FM in Mazatlán, Sinaloa, Mexico. It is owned by Radio Cañón and known as Radio Cañón.

History
XHVOX began operations in 1939 as XEDS-AM 1400, owned by Alejandro A. Schober. In 1960, Schober sold the station, and it became XEOW-AM, broadcasting on 970 kHz. It was owned by Mendivil y Elizalde, S.A. until its sale to Amplitud Modulada de Sinaloa, S.A., in 1985. Amplitud Modulada rechristened the station XEVOX-AM.

It was sold to ABC in 2008 and migrated to FM in 2011. In April 2018, operation of XHVOX and XHENX-FM 104.3 transferred to Grupo Siete, which instituted its Quiéreme romantic format on the station. In February 2022, Grupo Siete dropped operation of both stations after nearly four years, with the flagship Radio Cañón brand of the ABC group being brought to Mazatlán.

References

Spanish-language radio stations
Radio stations in Sinaloa